Events from the year 1544 in India.

Events
 The Battle of Sammel was fought near what are now Giri and Sumel villages in the Jaitaran sub-division of Rajasthan's Pali district. The belligerents were Sher Shah Suri, founder of the Muslim Sur Empire, and Rao Maldeo Rathore, the Hindu Rajput  king of Marwar.

Births
Dadu Dayal

Deaths

See also

 Timeline of Indian history

References